Ballast is a 2008 film directed by Lance Hammer. It competed in the Dramatic category at the 2008 Sundance Film Festival, where it won the awards for Best Director and Best Cinematography.  The film received six nominations in the 2009 Film Independent Spirit Awards.

Plot

The film opens with a local man driving to the home of Lawrence and Darius, twin brothers who operate a local store. Upon entering the home, the man discovers Darius dead in his bedroom with Lawrence sitting on the couch unable to speak. Lawrence then walks to a neighboring property and shoots himself in the chest, which he survives. In the hospital, it is revealed that Darius committed suicide. Depressed and unable to return to the store he owns, Lawrence spends his days at the property he shared with his brother. Meanwhile, James, Darius' estranged pubescent son, steals Lawrence's gun and holds him at gunpoint for money to buy crack. After a failing to repay debts to his drug dealer, James and his mother, Marlee, are targeted in a drive-by assault. Unable to return home, Marlee confronts Lawrence about Darius leaving her and James many years prior and moves into Darius' vacant apartment. After she is fired from her job as a cleaner, James convinces Lawrence to buy them food, which he does. Bound by these numerous tragedies, the trio form a de facto family, determined to move forward, starting with Marlee convincing Lawrence to let her run the store. The pair loosely decides to raise James together, beginning with a shared homeschooling schedule to keep James away from the negative influences that led him to drugs in the first place. The film ends when Lawrence discovers that ammunition is missing. He confronts James, fearing he has found himself another gun, only to find that James had thrown the bullets into a stream, to prevent Lawrence from attempting to harm himself again.

Cast
 Michael J. Smith Sr. as Lawrence
 JimMyron Ross as James
 Tarra Riggs as Marlee
 Johnny McPhail as John

Reception
Ballast received critical acclaim. The review tallying website Rotten Tomatoes summarized its research by saying that critics considered the movie "A searing debut by director Lance Hammer, this subtle and contemplative Mississippi set drama lingers long after its conclusion." The website reports that 61 out of the 67 reviews it tallied for the film were positive for a score of 91% and a certification of "fresh". Roger Ebert of the Chicago Sun-Times gave the film four stars out of four, saying the film "inexorably grows and deepens and gathers power and absorbs us."  He later named it as one of the 20 best films of 2008.

It was nominated for a 2008 Independent Spirit Award for Best Film.

Top ten lists
The film appeared on several critics' top ten lists of the best films of 2008.

2nd - Sheri Linden, The Hollywood Reporter
3rd - Wesley Morris, The Boston Globe
4th - Kenneth Turan, Los Angeles Times (tied with Frozen River)

References

External links

Official Site of the Film
IONCINEMA.com interview with Lance Hammer

2008 films
American independent films
African-American drama films
Films set in Mississippi
Films shot in Mississippi
Southern Gothic films
2008 drama films
2008 independent films
2000s English-language films
2000s American films